Beesoniella is a genus of true bugs belonging to the family Aphrophoridae.

Species
Species:
 Beesoniella sylvestris Lallemand, 1933

References

Aphrophoridae
Auchenorrhyncha genera